Maryam bint Imran is revered in Islam as the only woman named in the Quran, which refers to her seventy times and explicitly identifies her as the greatest woman to have ever lived. In the Quran, her story is related in three Meccan surahs (19, 21, 23) and four Medinan surahs (3, 4, 5, 66). The nineteenth Surah, Maryam, is named after her. The Quran refers to Mary more often than the Bible.

According to the Quran, Mary's parents had been praying for a child. Their request was eventually accepted by God, and Mary's mother became pregnant. Her father Imran had died before the child was born. After her birth, she was taken care of by her maternal uncle Zechariah. According to the Quran, Mary received messages from God through the archangel Gabriel. God informed Mary that she had miraculously conceived a child through the intervention of the divine spirit, though she was still a virgin. The name of her child is chosen by God, being Isa (Jesus), who would be the "anointed one", the Promised Messiah. As such, orthodox Islamic belief has upheld the virgin birth of Jesus, and although the classical Islamic thinkers never dwelt on the question of the perpetual virginity of Mary, it was generally agreed in traditional Islam that Mary remained a virgin throughout her life, with the Quran's mention of Mary's purification “from the touch of men” implying perpetual virginity in the minds of many of the most prominent Islamic fathers.

Mary is believed to have been chosen by God, above all "the women of the worlds" in Islam. She is referred to by various titles in the Quran, with the most prominent being al-Qānitah.

Family
The Quran calls Mary "the daughter of Imran" and it mentions that people called her a "sister of Aaron (Harun)". Her mother, mentioned in the Quran only as the wife of Imran, prayed for a child and eventually conceived. According to al-Tabari, Mary's mother was named Hannah, and Imran, her husband, died before the child was born. Expecting the child to be male, Hannah vowed to dedicate him to isolation and service in the Temple. However, Hannah bore a daughter instead, and named her Maryam.

In the Quran

Mary is mentioned frequently in the Quran, and her narrative occurs consistently from the earliest chapters, revealed in Mecca, to the latest verses, revealed in Medina.

Birth
The birth of Mary is narrated in the Quran with references to her father as well as her mother. Mary's father is called Imran. He is the equivalent of Joachim in Christian tradition. Her mother, according to al-Tabari, is called Hannah, which is the same name as in Christian tradition (Saint Anne). Muslim literature narrates that Imran and his wife were old and childless and that, one day, the sight of a bird in a tree feeding her young aroused Anne's desire for a child. She prayed to God to fulfill her desire and vowed, if her prayer was accepted, that her child would be dedicated to the service of God.

According to Iraqi scholar and translator, N.J. Dawood, the Quran confuses Mary mother of Jesus with Mary the sister of Moses, when it refers to the father of Mary, the mother of Jesus, as Imran, which is the Arabic version of Amram, who is shown to be the father of Moses in Exodus 6:20. Dawood, in a note to Quran 19:28, where Mary the Mother of Jesus is referred to as the "Sister of Aaron", and Aaron was the brother of Mary sister of Moses, states: "It Appears that Miriam, Aaron's sister, and Maryam (Mary), mother of Jesus, were according to the Koran, one and the same person." Although Islamic studies of the beginning of the 20th century tended to see this as a mistake in genealogy, in more recent Islamic Studies of the 21st century the general consensus is, according to Angelika Neuwirth, Nicolai Sinai & Michael Marx, that the Quran does not make a genealogical error but instead makes use of Typology. This is, following Wensincks conclusion, supported by the figurative speech of the Quran and the Islamic tradition:  Similarly, Stowasser concludes that "to confuse Mary the mother of Jesus with Mary the sister of Moses and Aaron in Torah is completely wrong and in contradiction to the sound Hadith and the Qur'anic text as we have established".

The Quranic account of Mary's birth does not affirm an Immaculate Conception for Mary as Islam does not accept the doctrine of original sin, or an inherited fault in humans, as it is found in Christianity.

Early years
The Quran does not, specifically, point to the fact that Mary lived and grew up in a temple as the word miḥ'rāb in Quran 3:36 in its literal meaning refers to a private chamber or a public/private prayer chamber. The definitive idea of Mary growing up in a temple derived via external literature (i.e. see the narration below by Ja'far al-Sadiq). She was placed under the care of the prophet Zakariya, the husband of Hannah's sister and Mary's maternal uncle and caretaker. As often as Zechariah entered Mary's prayer chamber, he found her provided with food and he would ask her where she received it from, to which she would reply that God provides to whom He wills. Scholars have debated as to whether this refers to miraculous food that Mary received from God or whether it was normal food. Those in favor of the former view state that it had to be miraculous food, as Zechariah being a prophet, would have known that God is the provider of all sustenance and thus would not have questioned Mary, if it was normal food.

Imam Ja'far al-Sadiq narrates that when Maryam was grown, she would go into the mihrab and put on a covering so no one saw her. Zechariah went into the mihrab and found that she had summer fruit in the winter and winter fruit in the summer. He asked "From whence is this?" She said, "It is from Allah. Indeed, Allah provides for whom He wills without account"[3:37].

Annunciation

The virgin birth of Jesus is supremely important in Islam, as one of the most important miracles of God. The first explicit mention of an annunciation foreshadowing the birth of Jesus is in Quran 19:20 where Mary asks Gabriel (Jibril) how she will be able to conceive, when no man has touched her. Gabriel's reply assures Mary that for God all things are easy and that Jesus's virgin birth will be a sign for mankind. The birth is later referred in Quran 66:12, where the Quran states that Mary remained "pure", while God allowed a life to shape itself in Mary's womb. A third mention of the annunciation is in Q3:42–43, where Mary is also given the glad tidings that she has been chosen above all the women of creation.

Commentators on the Quran remark on the last verse that Mary was as close to a perfect woman as there could be, and she was devoid of almost all failings. Although Islam honors numerous women, including Hawwa, Hagar, Sarah, Asiya, Khadijah, Fatimah, Ayesha, Hafsa many commentators followed this verse in the absolute sense, and agreed that Mary was the greatest woman of all time. Other commentators, however, while maintaining that Mary was the "queen of the saints", interpreted this verse to mean that Mary was the greatest woman of that time and that Fatimah, Khadijah and Asiya were equally great. According to exegesis and literature, Gabriel appeared to Mary, who was still young in age, in the form of a well-made man with a "shining face" and announced to her the birth of Jesus. After her immediate astonishment, she was reassured by the angel's answer that God has the power to do anything. The details of the conception are not discussed during these Angelic visits, but elsewhere the Quran states (Quran 21:91) and 66:12) that God breathed "His Spirit" into Mary while she was chaste.

Virgin birth

According to the Quran, Mary was chosen twice by the Lord: "O Mary! Verily Allah has chosen you and purified you and chosen you above the women of the worlds" (Quran 3:42); and the first choosing was her selection with glad tidings given to Imran. The second was that she became pregnant without a man, so in this regard, she was chosen over all other women in the world.

The Quran narrates the virgin birth of Jesus numerous times. In chapter 19 (Maryam), verses (ayat) 17–21, the annunciation is given, followed by the virgin birth in due course. In Islam, Jesus is called the "spirit of God" because he was through the action of the spirit, but that belief does not include the doctrine of his pre-existence, as it does in Christianity. Quran 3:47 also supports the virginity of Mary, revealing that "no man has touched [her]".  Quran 66:12 states that Jesus was born when the spirit of God breathed upon Mary, whose body was chaste.

According to the Quran, the following conversation transpired between the angel Gabriel and Mary when he appeared to her in the form of a man:
And mention, [O Muhammad], in the Book [the story of] Mary, when she withdrew from her family to a place toward the east. And she took, in seclusion from them, a screen. Then We sent to her Our spirit, and he represented himself to her as a well-proportioned man. She said, "Indeed, I seek refuge in the Most Merciful from you, [so leave me], if you should be fearing of Allah." He said, "I am only the messenger of your Lord to give you a pure boy." She said, "How can I have a boy while no man has touched me and I have not been unchaste?" He said, "Thus [it will be]; your Lord says, 'It is easy for Me, and We will make him a sign to the people and a mercy from Us. And it is a matter [already] decreed.'[19:16-21]

The Quran's narrative of the virgin birth is somewhat different from that in the New Testament. The Quran states that when the pains of childbirth came upon Mary, she held onto a nearby palm tree, at which point a voice came from "beneath the (palm-tree)" or "beneath her", which said " "Grieve not! for thy Lord hath provided a rivulet beneath thee; "And shake towards thyself the trunk of the palm-tree: It will let fall fresh ripe dates upon thee." The Quran goes on to describe that Mary vowed not to speak to any man on that day, as God was to make Jesus, who Muslims believe spoke in the cradle, perform his first miracle. The Quran goes on to narrate that Mary then brought Jesus to the temple, where immediately she began to be taunted by all the men, excluding Zechariah, who believed in the virgin birth. The Israelites questioned Mary how she came to be with child whilst unmarried, to which Mary pointed to the baby Jesus. It was then that, according to the Quran, the infant Jesus began to speak in the cradle, and spoke of his prophecy for the first time.

According to Imam Ja'far al-Sadiq, Jesus the son of Mary used to cry intensely as a child, so that Mary was at wits end regarding his profuse crying. He said to her, "Get some of the bark of that tree, make a tonic from it and feed me with it." When he drank it, he cried intensely. Mary said, "What sort of prescription did you give me?" He said, "Oh my mother! Knowledge of prophet-hood and weakness of childhood."

The Fatimid Ismaili jurist Qadi al-Nu’man holds that the virgin birth of Jesus is meant to be interpreted symbolically. In his interpretation, Mary was the follower (lāḥiq), of the Imam Joachim (‘Imran). However, when Joachim realized that she was not suited for the Imamah, he passed it to Zechariah, who then passed it to John the Baptist. Meanwhile, Mary received spiritual inspiration (mādda) from God, revealing that he would invite a man [to the faith] who would become an exalted Speaker (nāṭiq) of a revealed religion (sharīʿa). According to al-Nu’man, the verses “She said: Lord! How can I have a child when no man has touched me?” (Quran 3:47) and “neither have I been unchaste” (Quran 19:20) are symbolic of Mary's saying, “How can I conduct the invitation (daʿwa) when the Imam of the Time has not given me permission to do so?” and “Nor shall I be unfaithful by acting against his command”, respectively. To this, a celestial hierarch replies “Such is God. He creates [i.e., causes to pass] what he wills” (Quran 3:47).

Islamic tradition
Mary is one of the most honored figures in Islamic theology, with Muslims viewing her as one of the most righteous women to have lived as per the Quranic verse, with reference to the Angelical salutation during the annunciation, "O Mary, God has chosen you, and purified you; He has chosen you above all the women of creation.". A minority of Muslims also view her as a prophet. Muslim women look upon her as an example and are known to visit both Muslim and Christian shrines. Muslim tradition, like Christian, honors her memory at Matariyyah near Cairo, and in Jerusalem. Muslims also visit the Bath of Mary in Jerusalem, where Muslim tradition recounts Mary once bathed, and this location was visited at times by women who were seeking a cure for barrenness.<ref>T. Canaan, Muhammaden Saints and Sanctuaries in Palestine, in Journal of the Palestine Oriental Sac., iv/1–2, 1924, 1–84</ref> Some plants have also been named after Mary, such as Maryammiah, which, as tradition recounts, acquired its sweet scent when Mary wiped her forehead with its leaves. Another plant is Kaff Maryam (Anastatica), which was used by some Muslim women to help in pregnancy, and the water of this plant was given to women to drink while praying.

Islamic literature does not recount many instances from Mary's later life, and her assumption is not present in any Muslim records. Nevertheless, some contemporary Muslim scholars, an example being Martin Lings, accepted the assumption as being a historical event from Mary's life. One of the lesser-known events which are recorded in Muslim literature is that of Mary visiting Rome with John and Thaddeus (Jude), the disciples (al-Hawāriyūn) of Jesus, during the reign of Nero.

Qadi al-Nu'man, the twelfth century Ismaili Muslim jurist and luminary, in his book on the esoteric interpretation of faith, Asās al-Ta'wīl, talks about the spiritual birth (milad al-bātin) of Jesus, as an interpretation of his story of physical birth (milad al-zāhir). He says that Mary, the mother of Jesus, was a metaphor for someone who nurtured and instructed Jesus, rather than physically giving birth to him. He also pointed out that Zachariah (The Imam of the Time) appointed Mary as one of his proofs (sing. hujja).

TitlesQānitah: Mary is so-called in Quran 66:12. The Arabic term implies the meaning, not only of constant submission to God but also absorption in prayer and invocation, meanings that coincides with the image of Mary spending her childhood in the temple of prayer. In this way, Mary personifies prayer and contemplation in Islam.Siddiqah: She who confirms the truth or She who has faith. Mary is called Siddiqah twice in the Quran (Q5:73–75 and Q66:12). The term has also been translated, She who believes sincerely completely.Sājidahا: She who prostrates to God in worship. The Quran states: "O Mary! Worship your Lord devoutly: prostrate yourself". While in Sujud, a Muslim is to praise God and glorify Him. In this motion, which Muslims believe to be derived from Marian nature, hands, knees, and the forehead touch the ground together.Rāki’ahا: She who bows down to God in worship. The Quran states: "O Mary! Bow down in prayer with those men, who bow down." The command was repeated by angels only to Mary, according to the Muslim view. Ruku' in Muslim prayer during prayer has been derived from Mary's practice.Tāhirah: She who was purified.Mustafiahا: She who was chosen. The Quran states: "O Mary! God has chosen you and purified you and again he has chosen you above all women of all nations of the worlds".Sa’imah: She who fasts. Mary is reported to fast one-half of a year in some Muslim traditions.
Many other names of Mary can be found in various other books and religious collections. In Hadith, she has been referred to by names such as Batul, Adhraa' (Ascetic Virgin), and Marhumah (Enveloped in God's Mercy).

Legacy
Mosques named after Mary:
 Mary Mother of Jesus Mosque in Hoppers Crossing, Victoria, Australia.
 Mosque Maryam (Mary), the Nation of Islam National Center, Chicago, IL
 Qal'bu Maryam Women's Mosque (Heart of Mary), Berkeley, CA
 Maryam Umm Eisa (Mary Mother of Jesus), Abu Dhabi, United Arab Emirates
 Mariam Al-Batool Mosque (Virgin Mary) in Paola, Malta
 Mary (Ahmadiyyah) Mosque in Galway, Ireland.

 Gallery 

See also
 Jesus in Islam
 Surah Maryam
 Saint Mary'' – Iranian film depicting the life of Mary

References

External links

 Our Lady and Islam: Heaven's Peace Plan, an article by Father Ladis J. Cizik, Blue Army National Executive Director. Part of All About Mary, an encyclopedic tool for information on Mary, the Mother of Christ, compiled by the University of Dayton's Marian Library/International Marian Research Institute, the world's largest repository of books, artwork and artifacts devoted to Mary and a pontifical center of research and scholarship.
 The Qur'an and Mary, part of All About Mary, an encyclopedic tool for information on Mary, the Mother of Christ, compiled by the University of Dayton's Marian Library/International Marian Research Institute.
 Jesus and The Virgin Mary in Islam By Juan Galvan
 Mary from Sufi Islam perspective

Islam and women

New Testament people in Islam
People of the Quran